Somerton and Frome is a constituency in Somerset represented in the House of Commons of the UK Parliament since 2015 by David Warburton, who was elected as a Conservative, but currently sits as an Independent after losing the Conservative whip in April 2022 following allegations of misconduct.

Boundaries 
1983–1997: The District of Yeovil wards of Blackmoor Vale, Brue, Burrow Hill, Camelot, Cary, Curry Rivel, Islemoor, Ivelchester, Langport and Huish, Martock, Milborne Port, Northstone, Turn Hill, Wessex, and Wincanton, and the District of Mendip wards of Beacon, Beckington and Rode, Coleford, Creech, Frome Badcox, Frome Fromefield, Frome Keyford, Mells, Nordinton, Postlebury, Selwood and Berkley, Stratton, and Vale.

1997–2010: The District of South Somerset wards of Blackmoor Vale, Brue, Burrow Hill, Camelot, Cary, Curry Rivel, Islemoor, Ivelchester, Langport and Huish, Martock, Milborne Port, Northstone, Turn Hill, Wessex, and Wincanton, and the District of Mendip wards of Beacon, Beckington and Rode, Coleford, Creech, Frome Badcox, Frome Fromefield, Frome Keyford, Frome Welshmill, Mells, Nordinton, Postlebury, Stratton, and Vale.

2010–present: The District of South Somerset wards of Blackmoor Vale, Bruton, Burrow Hill, Camelot, Cary, Curry Rivel, Islemoor, Langport and Huish, Martock, Milborne Port, Northstone, Tower, Turn Hill, Wessex, and Wincanton, and the District of Mendip wards of Beacon, Beckington and Rode, Coleford, Creech, Frome Berkley Down, Frome Fromefield, Frome Keyford, Frome Park, Frome Welshmill, Mells, Nordinton, Postlebury, Stratton, and Vale.

The constituency was created in 1983 from parts of the seat of Wells. It covers the east of the district of Mendip and the north of the district of South Somerset.

Constituency profile

This area has a mixed economy, including agriculture. In November 2012, it had below the national average proportion of jobseekers (3.8%) at 1.6% of the population.

Members of Parliament

Elections

Elections in the 2020s

Elections in the 2010s

Elections in the 2000s

Elections in the 1990s

Elections in the 1980s

See also 
 List of parliamentary constituencies in Somerset

Notes

References

Somerton and Frome
Constituencies of the Parliament of the United Kingdom established in 1983